Below is a list of Armenian language exonyms for places. This list only includes names that are significantly different from the local toponym, some exonyms are marked as historical, modern exonyms may match the toponyms.

Austria

Belgium

Czech Republic

Denmark

France

Georgia

Germany

Greece

Italy

Poland

Portugal

Spain

Sweden

Turkey

United Kingdom

See also 
List of European exonyms
List of Azerbaijani Turkish exonyms

Transliteration
Armenian
Exonyms